Woolwich is a suburb on the Lower North Shore of Sydney, in the state of New South Wales, Australia. Woolwich is located 11 kilometres north-west of the Sydney central business district, in the local government area of the Municipality of Hunter's Hill. Woolwich sits on the peninsula between the Lane Cove River and the Parramatta River, jutting out from Hunters Hill.

History
The suburb's name is derived from its namesake Woolwich, by the banks of the Thames in London. Parramatta River had been known as the 'Thames of the Antipodes' and other nearby suburbs were also named after Thames localities of Greenwich, Putney and Henley.

The area's Aboriginal name is 'Mookaboola' or 'Moocooboola', which means meeting of waters. An early settler was John Clarke, who bought land here in 1834 and is responsible for naming Clarke's Point. Samuel Onion was another early land owner with an ironmongery business and he gave the suburb its first name 'Onion Point' in 1835.

The world's first, union-led green ban was placed on the suburb. Jack Mundey and his followers in the Builder's Labourers Federation did not support the destruction of local habitat. They eventually won their battle and 'Kelly's Bush' remains today.

61 properties in Woolwich are listed on the NSW State Heritage Register, including the Woolwich Pier Hotel and the Woolwich Wharf.

Population

Demographics
In the 2016 Australian Bureau of Statistics Census of Population and Housing, the population of Woolwich stood at 814 people, 53.1% female and 46.9% male, and with a Median age of 51 years.  72.5% of people were born in Australia and 78.6% of people only spoke English at home. The most common responses for religion were Catholic 32.1%, No Religion 28.6% and Anglican 19.8%.

Woolwich's median weekly household income $3,211, compared with $1,438 in Australia. According to the Australian Taxation Office statistics for the financial year of 2016–2017, the postcode of 2110 (Hunters Hill & Woolwich) had an average taxable income of $156,069 making it the 10th wealthiest suburb in Australia. The most common response for occupations was Professionals with 37.7% of all responses. 76.1% of the suburbs occupied private dwellings were family households.

Politics 

Woolwich is in the federal electoral division of North Sydney. This seat was won by Joe Hockey, the current Treasurer of Australia at the 1996 federal election and retained most recently in the 2013 Australian federal election.
 North Sydney is one of only two original divisions in New South Wales, along with Wentworth, which have never been held by the Australian Labor Party (ALP).

For NSW state elections, Woolwich is in the Electoral district of Lane Cove. As of 2003 this seat is held by Liberal MP Anthony Roberts, who was last re-elected in the 2007 state election except for the March 2011 NSW State election.

Gallery

Schools
Marist Sisters' College, Woolwich and Woolwich Public School.

References

External links 

  
Discover Hunters Hill

 
Suburbs of Sydney
Municipality of Hunter's Hill
Lane Cove River